Vindhyarani is a 1948 Indian Telugu-language film directed by C. Pullayya. It is a film based on a drama written by Pingali Nagendra Rao. Pushpavalli played the title role of Vindhyarani.

Plot
Durjaya kills his elder brother Maharaja Jayaveera of the Vindhya Kingdom and occupies the throne. Satamitra secretly takes care of the Prince Sivasri and is waiting for an opportunity to take revenge. Avanti is the daughter of a subordinate king. She hates men. Durjaya connivingly brings her to the Kingdom and announces her as the Queen. Sivasri and Avanti start loving each other. Satamitra sends message to Sivasri to kill Durjaya. Thinking that his love is a hindrance to his revenge, he told Avanti to forget him and his love. Avanti plans to kill Durjaya and plans to marry Sivasri. Sivasri attacks Durjaya, but pardons him. Avanti kills him and escapes. The drama continues. At the end, Sivasri and Avanti get married and rule the Vindya Kingdom.

Credits

Cast
 Ramana Rao
 G. Varalakshmi
 Relangi
 Pushpavalli as Vindhyarani
 D. V. Subba Rao
 Sreevatsava
 A. V. Subba Rao
 B. Padmanabham
 Kumari Sakkubai

Crew
 Director: Chittajallu Pullayya
 Story and Dialogues: Pingali Nagendra Rao
 Production Company: Vyjayanthi Pictures
 Original Music: Eemani Sankara Sastri and Saluri Rajeswara Rao
 Cinematography: C. V. Ramakrishnan
 Film Editing: K. R. Krishnaswamy
 Art Direction: K. R. Sarma
 Sound Engineer: S. C. Gandhi
 Playback singer: Ghantasala

References

External links
 

1948 films
1940s Telugu-language films
Indian black-and-white films
Indian musical drama films
1940s musical drama films
1948 drama films
Films directed by C. Pullayya